Casey Schmidt (born 16 June 1981 in the United States) is an American retired soccer player.

Career

In the summer of 2000, Schmidt trained with a professional team in Brazil.

In 2003, he was drafted by Colorado Rapids in the MLS and scored 9 goals in preseason. However, he failed to score in 13 league appearances that year and was released at the end of the season.

References

External links
 Casey Schmidt at MLSsoccer.com

American soccer players
Association football forwards
Living people
1981 births
Colorado Rapids players
Boston College Eagles men's soccer players